Madagam  is a village in the Arimalam revenue block of Pudukkottai district, Tamil Nadu, India.

Demographics 
As per the 2001 census, Madagam had a total population of 288 with 138 males and 150 females.

References

Villages in Pudukkottai district